Events in the year 2022 in Eritrea.

Incumbents

Events 

 May 31 – The United Nations says that the Eritrean Defence Forces shelled the Ethiopian border town of Sheraro over the weekend, killing a 14-year-old girl and injuring 18 others.
 September 1 – The Tigray People's Liberation Front claims that Eritrea and Ethiopia have launched a joint offensive in the Tigray Region.

Deaths 

 February 9 – Abune Antonios, 94, Orthodox prelate.
 October 6 – Tekeste Baire, 69, trade union activist (NCEW).
 December 2 – Qerlos, 94, prelate, patriarch of the Eritrean Orthodox Tewahedo Church (since 2021).

See also 

COVID-19 pandemic in Africa
Tigray War
African Union
Common Market for Eastern and Southern Africa
Community of Sahel–Saharan States

References 

 
2020s in Eritrea
Years of the 21st century in Eritrea
Eritrea
Eritrea